Marc Reuther (born 23 June 1996 in Düsseldorf) is a German middle-distance runner specialising in the 800 metres. He represented his country at the 2017 World Championships without advancing to the semifinals. In addition, he won a bronze medal at the 2017 European U23 Championships.

International competitions

Personal bests

Outdoor
400 metres – 47.77 (Flieden 2016)
600 metres – 1:15.67 (Königstein 2021)
800 metres – 1:44.71 (Schifflange 2021)
1500 metres – 3:40.03 (Berlin 2018)
Indoor
400 metres – 48.50 (Erfurt 2014)
600 metres – 1:16.56 (Frankfurt 2021)
800 metres – 1:45.39 (Erfurt 2020)
1500 metres – 3:44.07 (Leipzig 2019)

References

1996 births
Living people
Sportspeople from Düsseldorf
German male middle-distance runners
World Athletics Championships athletes for Germany
German national athletics champions